Stockholm South, Stockholms södra, Stockholm S, locally known as Södra Station (Southern Station) is a railway station in Södermalm, Stockholm, Sweden.

The Stockholm South railway station was originally opened in the year 1860, and was originally the northern terminus of the Västra Stambanan railway line until the construction of Stockholm Central Station (Stockholm C). The 1860 building was replaced with a new building in 1926. The current station, which includes a large apartment complex above it, began construction in 1986 on the site of the original station, and was opened in 1989. The new station is underground, situated below the site of the old station, and on the railway line it is between Årstaberg and Stockholm C. The trains of the Stockholm commuter rail network stop at this station. About 5 minutes walk on Swedenborgsgatan is the Mariatorget metro station, located 350 metres away.

Stockholm South station is also connected to the Södra station–Hammarbyhamnen–Stadsgården freight branch line (sv:Industrispåret Södra station–Hammarbyhamnen–Stadsgården), which was built between 1925 and 1939 and which formerly provided access to the ports and wharves located at Hammarby and Stadsgården and also provided the only mainline connection with the Saltsjöbanan commuter rail system until 2000. A 550-metre underground spur line also branched off from said freight line to the underground complex at Södersjukhuset hospital (constructed 1937–1944).

City Line
The Stockholm City Line commuter rail tunnel under central Stockholm opened on 10 July 2017; the section of it under Södermalm starts at Stockholm South Station. The two northernmost platforms of the station, platforms 1 and 2, are used by commuter rail trains, and connect to the tunnel going north. The two southern platforms (3 and 4) are used by long-distance passenger trains and passing freight trains. 

When the long-distance rail connection between Stockholm South and Stockholm Central stations is interrupted (as for rail maintenance works during the summers of 2018 to 2020), Stockholm South becomes the terminus for long-distance trains between Stockholm and locations further south and east, with passengers able to continue the journey through commuter trains through the City Line.  Passengers will however need to purchase an SL fare in addition to their long distance ticket to be able to transfer to services running between Stockholm South and Stockholm City.

References

Railway stations located underground in Stockholm
1860 establishments in Sweden
Railway stations opened in 1860
Transit centers in Sweden